Helan Mountain Stadium is a multi-purpose stadium in Ningxia, China.  It is currently used mostly for football matches.  The stadium holds 39,872 spectators.  It opened in 2013.

References

Ningxia
Football venues in China
Multi-purpose stadiums in China